Fadia Farhani (born 5 February 1996) is a Tunisian taekwondo practitioner. 

She won a bronze medal in finweight at the 2013 World Taekwondo Championships, after being defeated by Anastasia Valueva in the semifinal. Her achievements at the African Taekwondo Championships include gold medals in 2014 and 2016, and a bronze medal in 2018.

At the 2016 African Taekwondo Olympic Qualification Tournament she won one of the bronze medals in the women's −49 kg event.

References

External links

1996 births
Living people
Tunisian female taekwondo practitioners
World Taekwondo Championships medalists
African Taekwondo Championships medalists
African Games medalists in taekwondo
21st-century Tunisian women
Competitors at the 2015 African Games
African Games silver medalists for Tunisia